Ronnie David Green (born in 1961) is the 20th chancellor of the University of Nebraska–Lincoln. As chancellor, Green is the chief executive of the state's flagship, a land-grant university, which is part of the University of Nebraska system. Green previously led the university's Institute of Agriculture and Natural Resources (since 2010), and served as interim Senior Vice Chancellor for Academic Affairs, the university's highest academic office, from 2015 to 2016.

Chancellorship 
On April 6, 2016, University of Nebraska system President Hank M. Bounds announced the selection of Green as chancellor of the University of Nebraska–Lincoln, Nebraska's flagship comprehensive research, Land-Grant and Big Ten University. He assumed the duties of the position on May 8, and was formally installed on April 6, 2017. The University of Nebraska-Lincoln was founded in 1869. Green is its 20th chancellor. Green announced in December of 2022 that he intends to retire by June of 2023.

Other career highlights 
Green has served on the animal science faculties of Texas Tech University and Colorado State University, as the national program leader for animal production research for the USDA’s Agricultural Research Service, and as executive secretary of the White House’s interagency working group on animal genomics within the National Science and Technology Council. Prior to returning to the University of Nebraska, he served as senior global director of technical services for Pfizer Animal Health’s (now Zoetis) animal genomics business.

He is a past-president of both the American Society of Animal Science (ASAS) and the National Block and Bridle Club and has served in a number of leadership positions for the U.S. Beef Improvement Federation, National Cattlemen’s Beef Association, National Pork Board, the National Research Council of the National Academy of Sciences, the Association of Public and Land-Grant Universities, and Alpha Gamma Rho national fraternity. He currently is a member of a number of boards including the Big Ten Conference, Neogen Corporation, and Supporters of Agricultural Research, and was recently named to the Presidential Forum of the NCAA representing the Big Ten Conference. He was named a fellow of ASAS in 2014 and a fellow of the American Association for the Advancement of Science in 2015 and was honored with the American Society of Animal Science’s Morrison Award, the highest international academic recognition for an animal scientist, in 2017.

Criticism over UNL’s diversity plan 
In 2021, amid a nationwide Republican effort to prohibit or restrict instruction of Critical Race Theory, Pete Ricketts said he opposed critical race theory. Asked to explain what critical race theory was, Ricketts said it was "one that really starts creating those divisions between us about defining who we are based on race and that sort of thing and really not about how to bring us together as Americans rather than—and dividing us and also having a lot of very socialist-type ideas about how that would be implemented in our state." Ricketts also called it "Marxist" and "really un-American."

Then Ronnie D. Green cently released racial equity plan by the University of Nebraska-Lincoln just widened. In a Monday press conference, Nebraska Gov. Pete Ricketts said he was misled by UNL Chancellor Ronnie Green by say "I have lost all faith in Ronnie Green. I don't believe anything he says anymore, and I don't know how you get that back," Ricketts said last week Green called him to let him know the university was going to be doing a program to increase the number of minority students, staff and faculty. Ricketts said he agreed with that effort, but believes the plan released highlights Critical Race Theory. "I could not be more disgusted with what just happened. From a process standpoint and a content standpoint," he said. "That document now says... the University of Nebraska is systemically racist." Ricketts claims the plan violates the constitution by promoting discrimination against White people "Our constitution specifically says in Article One, Section 30 that it prohibits racial discrimination based on skin color and racial preferences," Ricketts said this program does just that. Chancellor Ronnie Green for bravely beginning the dialogue." "I don't see a reason to applaud Ronnie Green as he did in the letter," Ricketts said claiming Green had made mistakes including 'misleading' him. "I want to see the University of Nebraska start taking steps to say we are not only not going to have Critical Race Theory, but demonstrate how they're not going to do it. Anti-racism is Critical Race Theory."

Academics and research 
Green has published 130 refereed publications and abstracts, nine book chapters, and 56 invited symposia papers; and has delivered invited presentations in 43 U.S. states and 21 countries around the world. He is a past-president of the American Society of Animal Science (ASAS). He was Elected Fellow of both ASAS and the American Association for the Advancement of Science, and in 2017 received the Morrison Award, the ASAS's most prestigious honor.

References 

Chancellors of the University of Nebraska-Lincoln
Virginia Tech alumni
Colorado State University alumni
University of Nebraska–Lincoln alumni
People from Lincoln, Nebraska
People from Fincastle, Virginia
Living people
1961 births